Geno Arce (born 1964 in Portland, Oregon), started playing bass in the clubs at age 16 opening for bands like Black 'n Blue and Fire Eye.  Graduating from high school in 1982, he joined the navy and did his stint for his country.  After receiving an honorable discharge, he returned to Portland for a short while and then relocated to Phoenix Arizona.  While in Phoenix Geno performed on the local scene and in Los Angeles with the bands "Syngin, SX, and Box of Cherries, which later became "The Einsteins."

In 1998 Geno joined forces with Ron Keel to form the "Roadhouse Rattlers" and began his journey into Southern Rock and Country Music.  In 1999 Ron Keel had to take a trip to Europe and Geno Joined Phoenix Arizona’s "Harry and the Gila Monsters" furthering a career in country music that would allow him to share the stage with acts such as Brooks and Dunn, Reba McEntire, Montgomery Gentry, Neal McCoy, and many others.

In 2000, Geno and Ron Keel were reunited, moved to Plain City Ohio where they formed the international southern rock band "IronHorse" consisting of Ron Keel vocals, Geno Arce Bass, Swedish musician Robert Marcello Guitar, and Gaetano Nicolosi on drums. During its five year lifetime IronHorse performed all throughout the United States opening for bands such as "The Outlaws and Ted Nugent" In 2008 Geno Joined the all original lineup of Keel consisting of Ron Keel, Marc Ferrari, Bryan Jay, Dwain Miller and replacing bassist Kenny Chaisson.

In June 2016 Geno was asked by Ron Keel to join him in another project called Badlands House Band. This band is part of a larger project in Sioux Falls SD called Badlands Pawn. and the brain child of Chuck Brennan.

Discography

SX
SX (1990) Woofa Records
Diamonds in the Rough (1992) Rodell Records

Einsteins, The
Einsteins, The (1996) Transmission Records
O (1998) Mellancamp Records

Harry and the Gila Monsters
Self Titled (1999) Self Release

IronHorse
IronHorse (2001) Melodic Mayhem Music
Warmth in the wilderness a tribute to Jason Becker (2001) Lion MusicBring It On (2004) CompendiaChange My Religion (2007) Self ReleaseKeelStreets of Rock & Roll (2010) Frontiers RecordsMetal Cowboy'' (2014) Wild Media Productions

References 

1964 births
Living people
Musicians from Portland, Oregon
Musicians from Phoenix, Arizona
American heavy metal bass guitarists
American male bass guitarists
Keel (band) members
20th-century American bass guitarists
21st-century American bass guitarists
20th-century American male musicians
21st-century American male musicians